Amanda Cook may refer to:

 Amanda Cook, Canadian actress who appeared as Lorraine "L.D." Delacorte in Degrassi
 Amanda Cook (born Amanda Falk), Canadian singer